The Ulster-Scots Heritage Council (USHC; Ulster-Scots: Ulstèr-Scotch Heirskip Cooncil) was established in 1995 as an umbrella organisation to represent the Ulster Scots community.

Cultural organisations based in Northern Ireland
+Heritage
Organizations established in 1955
1955 establishments in Northern Ireland